Hellinsia tariensis is a species of moth in the genus Hellinsia, known from Papua New Guinea. Moths in this species take flight in November, and have a wingspan of approximately 15-17 millimetres. The specific name refers to Tari, the village whence it was collected.

References

tariensis
Insects of Papua New Guinea
Moths described in 2003
Moths of New Guinea